George Wilson Younce (February 22, 1930 – April 11, 2005) was an American bass singer, known for performing with Southern gospel quartets, especially The Cathedrals.

Biography
Born in Patterson, North Carolina, Younce  was the youngest of four siblings. His father was his biggest influence when young Younce decided he wanted to be a singer. In 1936, the Younce family moved to Lenoir, North Carolina. At the age of 15 in his hometown, George received his first taste of Southern Gospel music. As a teenager, Younce joined his first quartet, known as the Spiritualaires. When his voice changed, he switched to the bass part that he would sing for the rest of his life.

Over the next decade he traveled with such groups as the Homeland Harmony Quartet, The Weatherfords, the Florida Boys, and the Blue Ridge Quartet. In September 1963, the "Cathedral Trio", became the official vocal group of Rex Humbard's "Cathedral of Tomorrow" in Akron, Ohio. In November 1964, Younce joined forces with lead singer Glen Payne, Tenor Bobby Clark and Baritone/Piano Player Danny Koker to form the "Cathedral Quartet" out of the "Cathedral Trio". They toured the world for 36 years.

Younce performed on the Gaither Homecoming Tour, at Radio City Music Hall and Carnegie Hall in New York City, and at the Billy Graham Crusades in Cleveland, Ohio and Nashville, Tennessee. His television appearances include the "Rex Humbard Hour", the "Gospel Singing Jubilee", the “Bill Gaither Homecoming Hour”, NBC’s Today Show, The Nashville Network, “Prime Time Country”, and “The Statler Brothers Show”.

Younce was a 14-time recipient of the Singing News Fan Award for “Favorite Southern Gospel Bass” singer. He was Gospel Music’s "Living Legend" of the year in 1988, was inducted into the "Southern Gospel Music Hall of Fame" located in Dollywood in 1998, also inducted in the Gospel Music Hall of Fame in 1999. He was awarded the 2004 SGN Scoops Diamond “Lifetime Achievement Award”. He recorded well over 100 projects including the award-winning “Symphony of Praise” with the London Philharmonic Orchestra. Younce also wrote several Southern Gospel songs including the classic "Yesterday".

In 1998, Younce recorded the first of three solo projects. Two were GMA nominees for Dove Awards in the Southern Gospel Album of the Year category. The third presents a collection of some of his favorite hymns.

With the death of his long-time friend and Cathedrals partner Glen Payne in October 1999, and Younce's failing kidneys, the Cathedrals retired in December 1999. In the fall of 2000, he appeared for the first time without the Cathedrals as a solo performer in Parkersburg, West Virginia on a show called "An Evening with George Younce and Ernie Haase". Late in his career, he sang with The Old Friends Quartet, which included his son-in-law, former Cathedral tenor Ernie Haase and Southern Gospel legend Jake Hess and baritone Wesley Pritchard and pianist Garry Jones. Younce also provided the voice for some of the characters in several of the Bill Gaither produced "Gaither's Pond" children's videos. Although he had to stop officially touring, he did make occasional "special appearances" with son-in-law Ernie's new quartet Ernie Haase and Signature Sound, and with his friend Bill Gaither and the Homecoming Tour.

Death
Younce suffered from heart trouble as well as kidney failure, and was on dialysis during the last years of his life. He died April 11, 2005 at Akron City Hospital in Ohio. He and his wife, Clara, would have celebrated their 50th wedding anniversary April 27.

Awards
SGMA Hall Of Fame (1998)
GMA Hall Of Fame (1999)
Singing News Fan Awards:
Favorite Male Singer (1999, 2000)
Favorite Bass Singer (1981, 1983, 1984, 1986, 1987, 1988, 1992, 1993, 1994, 1995, 1996, 1997, 1998, 1999)

Discography

Solo
1997: I Believe (Spring Hill Records/CMD5412)
1998: That Says It All (Spring Hill Records/CMD5455)
2000: Out Front (Landmark Records/HD0041)
2000: Day By Day (Cathedral Records)
2004: This Is George Younce (George Younce Music)
2005: A Tribute To George Younce (Gaither Music Group/SHD2643)
????: Poetic Reflections (George Younce Music)

Songs authored
(Partial List)
Movin' Up To Gloryland
Better Days
Glory Hallelujah I'm On My Way
He Is The Dearest Friend
He Is The Great I Am
He Made A Rainbow Of My Tears
I Know He's Mine
If I Can Just Hold Out
It's Alright
Jesus Can Make A Way
Jesus Christ Solid Rock
Jesus Is A Coming Back
Little Deeds
My Lord
No Disappointments In Heaven
Row Your Boat
Shine On For Jesus
So Dearly
So I Love Him Dearly
Take His Hand
Thanks For Loving Me
The Laughing Song
Then I Found Jesus
There'll Be No Peace Till Jesus Comes Again
What Are You Going To Leave
When I Get Home
When The First Drop Of Blood Fell From The Cross
Yesterday
You Ain't Heard Nothing Yet

Literature
Glen Payne, George Younce, Ace Collins, The Cathedrals: The Story of America's Best-Loved Gospel Quartet, 2000

References

Southern gospel performers
1930 births
2005 deaths
20th-century American singers
American performers of Christian music
People from Lenoir, North Carolina
People from Caldwell County, North Carolina
20th-century American male singers